Jacques Besnard (Also known as Jacques Treyens; born 15 July 1929 in Le Petit-Quevilly - died 9 November 2013 in Boutigny-Prouais) was a French film director, assistant director, producer, actor and screenwriter.

Life and career 
Jacques Besnard was born on 15 July 1929 in Le Petit-Quevilly, Seine-Maritime, France. He began his career in 1962 as the first assistant to director André Hunebelle, after having had some previous experience as an actor in 1955 and as an assistant director under Maurice Régamey, Yves Robert and Alberto Lattuada between 1956 and 1961. Besnard worked alongside Hunebelle on movies such as: Les Mystères de Paris (1962), Banco à Bangkok pour OSS 117 (1964), Fantômas (1964), Furia à Bahia pour OSS 117 (1965) and Fantômas se déchaîne (1965). It was during this time that Besnard met actor Louis de Funès when they worked together on the two Fantômas movies.

Besnard would go on to direct his own movie titled Le Grand Restaurant in 1966, which he co-wrote with Jean Halain and Louis de Funès. It starred de Funès and Bernard Blier as the main characters of the comedy film, and ranked as the eighth-most-popular film at the French box office that year. In 1967 Besnard would go on to direct the comedy film  starring Jean Lefebvre and Bernard Blier, from which he attainted much acclaim and public popularity. Besnard directed a few Boulevard comedies in the 1970s with varying degrees of success. He most notably worked as assistant director under Gérard Oury in the 1973 comedy Les Aventures de Rabbi Jacob, starring Louis de Funès. However, by the 1980s, Besnard left the silver screen to focus on directing opportunities for television shows and movies.

Jacques Besnard died on 9 November 2013 in Boutigny-Prouais, Eure-et-Loir, France, aged 84. He is the father of French director Éric Besnard.

Filmography

References 

1929 births
2013 deaths
French male film actors
French film directors
French male screenwriters
20th-century French screenwriters
21st-century French screenwriters
20th-century French male actors
20th-century French male writers
21st-century French male writers